The Best of the Proclaimers is a compilation album  by Scottish band The Proclaimers released in 2002 and re-released in 2007.

Three tracks ("The Doodle Song", "Ghost of Love", and "Lady Luck") were newly recorded for the compilation.

The album's sleeve notes were written by the comedian and Proclaimers fan Matt Lucas.

Critical reception
The Best of The Proclaimers attracted some positive reception. Hal Horowitz of AllMusic asserted the compilation to be "near-faultless", describing it as an almost-perfect "summary of their most significant songs"; acknowledging it to be the "only [Proclaimers album] any but die-hard fans will need".

Track listing

Chart

Certifications

References 

2002 greatest hits albums
2007 greatest hits albums
The Proclaimers albums